James Mitchell Collins (April 29, 1916 – July 21, 1989) was an American businessman and a Republican who represented the Third Congressional District of Texas from 1968 to 1983. The district was based at the time around Irving in Dallas County.

Background

Collins was born in Hallsville in Harrison County in East Texas. His father, Carr Collins Sr., had founded the Fidelity Union Life Insurance Company; his sister was Ruth Sharp Altshuler. He graduated from Woodrow Wilson High School in Dallas. In 1989, Collins was inducted into the Woodrow Wilson High School Hall of Fame the same year it was created in celebration of the sixtieth anniversary of the institution. Collins graduated thereafter from Southern Methodist University.

In 1966, Collins ran for the U.S. House in the 3rd District, a newly created district in north Dallas. He lost to incumbent Democrat Joe R. Pool in a close race, taking 46 percent of the vote to Pool's 53 percent. Pool died in July 1968, and Collins won the ensuing  special election, defeating Pool's widow, Elizabeth, with over 60 percent of the vote. His victory was part of a strong trend toward the GOP in north Dallas; this district has been in Republican hands without interruption since then. He won a full term in the general election that fall, he received 81,696 votes (59.4 percent) to 55,939 (40.6 percent) for Democrat Robert H. Hughes. He would never face another contest nearly that close, never dropping below 64 percent of the vote and even running unopposed in 1978.

References

External links

Entry on the Political Graveyard
History of I&R in Texas

1916 births
1989 deaths
United States Army personnel of World War II
Southern Methodist University alumni
Harvard Business School alumni
People from Irving, Texas
Politicians from Dallas
People from Hallsville, Texas
United States Army officers
Republican Party members of the United States House of Representatives from Texas
20th-century American politicians
Military personnel from Texas